What About Me? is the debut album by Nicole (real name Lillie McCloud). The album simply refers to her as Nicole. Timmy Thomas appears on the album with Nicole on the song "New York Eyes".

Track listing

Side one
 "Don't You Want My Love"
 "New York Eyes" (with Timmy Thomas)
 "Housecalls"
 "What About Me"

Side two
"Always and Forever"
"Why You Take My Love"
"Ordinary Girl"
"Shy Boy"
"It Happens Every Night"

References

1986 debut albums
Portrait Records albums